The octavina or Philippine octavina is a guitar-shaped Filipino instrument with a tuning similar to the laúd. Originally a Spanish instrument, the octavina was soon incorporated into other cultures, notably including Filipino culture.

History
With the large Spanish influence on Filipino culture from the 16th to the 19th century, many traditional Spanish instruments became incorporated into local music, and after passed time, have evolved into entirely unique instruments. The Spanish precursor to the octavina may have been the smaller-bodied, 12 string Bandurria-like instrument called the "Octavilla", although its use was not as prominent or popular. The name as translated in all versions of the instrument has the prefix of octa- which refers to the tuning of each set of double strings.

Today it is most commonly found in the local variant of the rondalla, a hispanic string orchestra.

Tuning
The Octavina has a set of 14 strings ( in 6 courses: 6th-single, 5th-double, 4th-double, 3rd-triple, 2nd-triple and 1st-triple. It is numbered starting from the bottom. It is tuned similarly to that of the bandurria, but one octave lower, giving:
1st: G4 G4 G4
2nd: D4 D4 D4
3rd: A3 A3 A3
4th: E3 E3
5th: B2 B2
6th: F#2

Construction
Formed like a guitar with in most cases, a figure eight-shaped body and a round sound hole, the Octavina has a shorter neck, often with only 16 frets, though some octavinas may have 18 to 20 frets, like its close relative, the laúd. The instrument is played like the laúd plays, the lower notes in accompaniments and in unison with the bass notes.

See also

Laúd
Bandurria
Music of the Philippines
Rondalla

References

Philippine musical instruments
Guitar family instruments
Southeast Asian music